Don't Hold Back That Feeling is the fourth studio album by Australian musician, Andrew Pendlebury, released in 1992. At the ARIA Music Awards of 1993 the album won the Best Adult Contemporary Album.

Background 

Australian guitarist Andrew Pendlebury's fourth solo studio album, Don't Hold Back That Feeling, was released in May 1992. For his previous album Zing Went the Strings (1990) he worked with Pete Linden on pedal steel guitar, Paul Grabowsky on piano, Stephen Hadley on bass guitar, J. J. Hacket on drums, as well as Stephen Cummings, Doug de Vries, Shane O'Mara, Nick Smith and Michael Williams.

For Don't Hold Back That Feeling he enlisted guest vocalists Kate Ceberano, Deborah Conway, Dave Steel and Chris Wilson. Session musicians included members from Ceberano's backing band Ministry of Fun: Stephen Hadley on bass guitar, Peter Jones on drums and Jex Saarlehart on keyboards. It was critically acclaimed and, the following year, won the Best Adult Contemporary Album at the ARIA Music Awards of 1993.

Track listing

References

1992 albums
ARIA Award-winning albums